Dalai is an administrative ward in the Chemba District of the Dodoma Region of Tanzania. In 2016 the Tanzania National Bureau of Statistics report there were 16,387 people in the ward, from 15,078 in 2012.

References

Wards of Dodoma Region